Kendall is a unisex given name. Notable people with the given name include:

Notable people who were named Kendall 
Kendall Anthony (born 1993), American basketball player
Kendall Blanton (born 1995), American football player
Kendall Brown (born 1989), New Zealand snowboarder
Kendall Brown (basketball) (born 2003), American basketball player
Kendall Donnerson (born 1996), American football player
Kendall Hart, fictional character in the soap opera All My Children
Kendall Hinton (born 1997), American football player
Kendall Hunter (born 1988), American football running back 
Kendall Holt (born 1981), American professional boxer
Kendall James (born 1991), American football player
Kendall Jenner (born 1995), American model and TV personality
Kendall Gill (born 1968), American basketball player
Kendall Graveman (born 1990), American baseball player
Kendall Grove (born 1982), American mixed martial artist
Kendall Marshall (born 1991), American basketball player
Kendall Schmidt (born 1990), American actor and singer
Kendall Sheffield (born 1996), American football player
Kendall Wright (born 1989), American football player